The Gulfstream G280 is a twin-engine business jet built by Israel Aerospace Industries (IAI) for Gulfstream Aerospace. It began delivery to users in 2012.

Development

In 2005, Gulfstream and IAI began designing a follow-on aircraft to the Gulfstream G200. The new model, named G250, was launched in 2008. Planned improvements included new glass cockpit and engines, larger wing, and heated leading edges.

The G250 took its maiden flight on December 11, 2009, in Tel Aviv, Israel. In July 2011, the G250 was renamed G280, as the company had "determined that G280 is a more amenable number sequence [than G250] in certain cultures." In Mandarin, the number 250 can be translated as "stupid" or "idiotic".

It can fly from London to New York or Singapore to Dubai.

The G280 was provisionally certified in December 2011 by Israel. In July 2012, the US FAA released a report with conditions to ensure no security gaps in the G280's electronic systems. It received full certification from Israel and the US on September 4, 2012.
In 2021, its equipped price was $24.5M.

Design
The aerodynamic design of its wing and empennage, and design of the interior were performed by Gulfstream; detailed design was performed by IAI to Gulfstream's requirements.  It is a Gulfstream designed aircraft under a new type certificate.

The aircraft has several improvements, among them increased cabin length (external fuselage dimensions remain unchanged; the rear fuselage fuel tank was eliminated to add  of usable interior area). It has a new HTF7250G engine, new T-tail (with larger horizontal and vertical stabilizers), wing anti-ice provided by engine bleed air, cabin with four more windows and access from the cabin to the baggage compartment. It competes against the Bombardier Challenger 300 and the Cessna Citation X+. The fuselage, empennage and landing gear are manufactured by IAI, the wing by Spirit AeroSystems (now by Triumph Group), and the aircraft is assembled in Israel. It is then ferried to Dallas, Texas, for interior finishing and painting.

Its wing is a new design, using the Gulfstream G550 airfoil, and has a larger area of 495 ft² vs. 369 ft² of the G200. Design cruise for the new airfoil is Mach 0.80, vs. Mach 0.75 for the G200 wing.

Specifications

See also

References

External links

 
 

Israeli business aircraft
G280
G280
T-tail aircraft
Twinjets
Low-wing aircraft
Aircraft first flown in 2009